Zaozerye is a rural locality (a village) in Nizhneslobodskoye Rural Settlement, Vozhegodsky District, Vologda Oblast, Russia. The population was 3 as of 2002.

Geography 
Zaozerye is located 56 km east of Vozhega (the district's administrative centre) by road. Mitinskaya is the nearest rural locality.

References 

Rural localities in Vozhegodsky District